Elachista patania is a moth of the family Elachistidae. It is found in the coastal areas of south-western Western Australia.

The wingspan is 10.5-11.3 mm for males. The forewings are bluish grey and the hindwings are grey.

References

Moths described in 2011
patania
Moths of Australia